The third season of the American television series Superman & Lois premiered on The CW on March 14, 2023. The series is based on the DC Comics characters Superman and Lois Lane created by Jerry Siegel and Joe Shuster. The season was produced by Berlanti Productions, DC Studios, and Warner Bros. Television.

The series stars Tyler Hoechlin and Elizabeth Tulloch as the titular characters, Clark Kent / Superman, a costumed superhero, and his wife, Lois Lane, the world's best and most famous reporter. Also returning are main cast members Alex Garfin, Erik Valdez, Inde Navarrette, Wolé Parks, Dylan Walsh, Emmanuelle Chriqui, Tayler Buck, and Sofia Hasmik. They are joined by Michael Bishop and Chad L. Coleman. Superman & Lois was renewed for a third season by The CW in March 2022.

Cast and characters

Main
 Tyler Hoechlin as Kal-El / Clark Kent / Superman
 Elizabeth Tulloch as Lois Lane
 Alex Garfin as Jordan Kent
 Michael Bishop as Jonathan Kent
 Erik Valdez as Kyle Cushing
 Inde Navarrette as Sarah Cortez
 Wolé Parks as John Henry Irons
 Tayler Buck as Natalie Irons
 Sofia Hasmik as Chrissy Beppo
 Chad L. Coleman as Bruno Mannheim
 Dylan Walsh as Samuel Lane
 Emmanuelle Chriqui as Lana Lang

Recurring
 Michael Cudlitz as Lex Luthor

Guest
 Mariana Klaveno as Lara Lor-Van
 Angel Parker as Dr. Irons

Episodes
Season three will consist of 13 episodes.

David Ramsey will direct an episode.

Production

Development
On March 22, 2022, The CW renewed the series for a third season. The season will be the first one released under the DC Studios brand, which took over development on all DC-related media after its foundation in November 2022.

Casting
Main cast members Tyler Hoechlin, Elizabeth Tulloch, Alex Garfin, Erik Valdez, Inde Navarrette, Wolé Parks, Dylan Walsh, Emmanuelle Chriqui, Taylor Buck, and Sofia Hasmik return as Kal-El / Clark Kent / Superman, Lois Lane, Jordan Kent, Kyle Cushing, Sarah Cortez, John Henry Irons, Samuel Lane, Lana Lang-Cushing, Natalie Irons, and Chrissy Beppo. Jordan Elsass, who portrayed Jonathan Kent, departed the series ahead of the third season for personal reasons. The following month, his role was recast to Michael Bishop and Chad L. Coleman was cast as Bruno Mannheim. In January 2023, Michael Cudlitz was announced to be portraying the show's version of Lex Luthor.

Filming
Filming for the season began on September 6, 2022, in Vancouver, BC and concluded on March 14, 2023.

Release
The season premiered on The CW on March 14, 2023.

Ratings

References

External links
 

Superman & Lois seasons
2023 American television seasons